Year 211 (CCXI) was a common year starting on Tuesday of the Julian calendar. At the time, in the Roman Empire it was known as the Year of the Consulship of Terentius and Bassus (or, less frequently, year 964 Ab urbe condita). The denomination 211 for this year has been used since the early medieval period, when the Anno Domini calendar era became the prevalent method in Europe for naming years.

Events 
 By place 

 Roman Empire 
 February 4 – Emperor Septimius Severus, having fallen ill, dies in Eboracum (modern-day York) while on campaign in Britain after an 18-year reign. He is later deified by the Senate. His sons Caracalla and Geta succeed him as joint Roman Emperors.
 December 19 – Geta is lured to come without his bodyguards to meet Caracalla, to discuss a possible reconciliation. When he arrives the Praetorian Guard murders him, and he dies in the arms of his mother Julia Domna.
 Eboracum becomes the capital of Britannia Inferior, a northern province of the Roman Empire.

 China 
 January – Warlord Cao Cao writes Ràng Xiàn Zì Míng Běn Zhì Lìng (讓縣自明本志令)
 March – September: Battle of Tong Pass: Cao Cao defeats Ma Chao.

 Parthia 
 Ardashir I becomes king of part of Persia.

 By topic 

 Art 
 Baths of Caracalla construction begins (approximate date).

 Religion 
 Marcus I is succeeded by Philadelphus, as Patriarch of Constantinople.

Births 
 Sima Zhao, Chinese general and politician (d. 265)
 Xiahou Hui (or Yuanrong), Chinese noblewoman (d. 234)

Deaths 
 February 4 – Septimius Severus, Roman emperor (b. 145)
 December 26 – Publius Septimius Geta, Roman emperor (b. 189)
 Fulvia Plautilla, Roman empress and wife of Caracalla
 Serapion of Antioch, patriarch of Antioch

References